Inna Vasilyevna Deriglazova (born 10 March 1990) is a Russian right-handed foil fencer.

Deriglazova is a two-time team and two-time individual European champion, and three-time team and three-time individual world champion. A three-time Olympian, Deriglazova is a 2012 team Olympic silver medalist, 2021 team Olympic champion, 2021 individual Olympic silver medalist, and 2016 individual Olympic champion. Deriglazova competed in the 2012 London Olympic Games, the 2016 Rio de Janeiro Olympic Games, and the 2020 Tokyo Olympic Games.

Career

Deriglazova began fencing at the age of 8 in hometown Kurchatov. She underwent training under Ildar Mavlyutov. Despite her diminutive frame as a child, she became accustomed to fencing athletes much older than herself. She won a bronze medal at the 2006 Cadet World Championships in Taebaek, followed a year later by the gold medal in the individual and team events at the Cadet World Championships in Novi Sad. The same year, she took the bronze medal in the Junior World Championships at Prague. She became Junior World Champion in Amsterdam in 2008.

Shortly after her world title, Deriglazova married and gave birth to a daughter, Diana. She stopped training just a week before delivery and went back to the piste two weeks afterwards. Two months after giving birth, she earned the silver medal in the Russian national championship. A year after, in 2010, she took the gold in the individual and team event of the Junior World Championships in Baku. The same year, she joined the senior national team and took a bronze medal in the individual and team events of the senior European Championships in Leipzig.

Deriglazova climbed her first World Cup podium in 2011 with a silver medal in Tauberbischofsheim. She was stopped by Korea's Nam Hyun-hee in the table of 16 of the 2011 World Championships in Catania. In the team event, Russia defeated France in the quarter-finals, then Korea to meet the Italian "Dream Team". Russia lost and were doomed to a silver medal. At the 2012 European Championships she defeated reigning Olympic silver medallist Arianna Errigo in the semi-finals and prevailed over teammate Kamilla Gafurzianova to earn her first senior individual title. For her Olympic début at London 2012, she was defeated 8–15 in the second round of the individual event by France's Ysaora Thibus. In the team event Russia got the best of Japan, then of South Korea. They met No.1 rivals Italy in the final. Deriglazova opened the match against five-time Olympic champion Valentina Vezzali and was defeated 2–5. Her teammates could not contain Italy either and Russia were eventually defeated 31–45.

Deriglazova was left extremely frustrated by her Olympic experience and resolved to train harder under the new direction of Stefano Cerioni, former coach of the Italian foil teams. During the 2012–13 season she won her first World Cup title at Budapest, followed by three other victories in Saint-Petersbourg, Tauberbischofsheim and Seoul. Her ambitions for the 2013 European Championships in Zagreb were however cut short in the first round of the individual event by World No.88 Anastasiya Moskovska. In the team event, Russia were defeated by France in the semi-finals, then by Hungary in the match for the bronze medal, and came away with no medal. Deriglazova bounced back by taking the gold medal at the 2013 Summer Universiade after defeating teammate Larisa Korobeynikova in the final. At the World Championships in Budapest Deriglazova made her way to the semi-finals, where she was defeated 15–11 by Arianna Errigo and took the bronze medal. In the team event, Russia were defeated by France in the semi-finals, but prevailed over South Korea to earn the bronze medal.

In the pre-Olympic season of 2015, Deriglazova climbed the podium three times at the World Cups, winning bronze medals in Saint-More, Algeria and Tauberbischofsheim (defeats to Lee Kiefer and twice to Errigo in the semifinals). She also lost twice in the finals of the Grand Prix stages in Havana and Shanghai to Di Francisca, but at the World Championships in Moscow, she interrupted a series of failures by defeating Kiefer in 1/4, Errigo in the semifinals and compatriot Aida Shanaeva in the final, and won the first individual gold medal.

In the Olympic season, she won silver in Turin (lost to Volpi), bronze in Gdansk (lost to Errigo) and Algeria (lost to Batini), and gold at the last stage in Tauberbischofsheim, defeating Errigo in the final. At the games in Rio, Deriglazova became the Olympic champion, defeating Di Francisca 12:11 in the final.

At the 2019 European Championship in Germany, she lost the final to Italian Elisa Di Francisca and won a silver medal. Three days later she helped the Russian national team win the team championship. However, in the semifinals of the World Championship, she won her third title in individual competitions at the World Championships, defeating Frenchwoman Pauline Ranvier in the final match. In the team championship, she also became the world champion.

At the Olympic Games in Tokyo in July 2021, Deriglazova was the favorite in the individual championship, but won only silver, losing to American Lee Kiefer in the final. A few days later she won gold in the team tournament.

Medal record

Olympic Games

World Championship

European Championship

Grand Prix

World Cup

References

External links

 
 
 
 
 
 

Russian female foil fencers
1990 births
Living people
Olympic fencers of Russia
Fencers at the 2012 Summer Olympics
Fencers at the 2016 Summer Olympics
Fencers at the 2020 Summer Olympics
Olympic gold medalists for the Russian Olympic Committee athletes
Olympic silver medalists for the Russian Olympic Committee athletes
Olympic gold medalists for Russia
Olympic silver medalists for Russia
Olympic medalists in fencing
Medalists at the 2012 Summer Olympics
Medalists at the 2016 Summer Olympics
Medalists at the 2020 Summer Olympics
Universiade medalists in fencing
People from Kurchatov, Russia
Universiade gold medalists for Russia
Medalists at the 2013 Summer Universiade
Sportspeople from Kursk Oblast